Xenosepsis is a genus of flies in the family Sepsidae.

Species
Xenosepsis africana (Ozerov, 1999)
Xenosepsis fukuharai Iwasa, 1984
Xenosepsis sydneyensis Malloch, 1925

References

Sepsidae
Diptera of Asia
Diptera of Africa
Diptera of Australasia
Taxa named by John Russell Malloch
Brachycera genera